Department of Labor and Workforce Development may refer to:

Alaska Department of Labor and Workforce Development
California Labor and Workforce Development Agency
New Jersey Department of Labor and Workforce Development